Adolf Abrahamowicz (November 7, 1849 – August 16, 1899) was an Austro-Hungarian Armenian writer who wrote in the Polish language. He was a landowner, but lived of his life in Lviv. He worked with many directors and actors, especially with Ryszard Ruszkowski (from 1884-1891). His farce and slapstick was very popular in the Polish entertainment repertoire of the nineteenth century.

References

1849 births
1899 deaths
Austro-Hungarian writers
Austro-Hungarian Armenians
19th-century Armenian writers
Polish people of Armenian descent
19th-century Polish landowners